Alworth is an unincorporated community in Winnebago Township, Winnebago County, Illinois, United States.

References

Unincorporated communities in Winnebago County, Illinois
Unincorporated communities in Illinois